The Samoic–Outlier languages, also known as Samoic languages, are a purported group of Polynesian languages, encompassing the Polynesian languages of Samoa, Tuvalu, American Samoa, Tokelau, Wallis and Futuna, and Polynesian outlier languages in New Caledonia, the Solomon Islands, Vanuatu, Papua New Guinea, and the Federated States of Micronesia.  The name "Samoic-Outlier" recognizes Sāmoan.

Classification
According to Ethnologue 16, the Samoic languages are as follows: 
  
East Uvean–Niuafoou
Niuafoou (in Tonga)
Uvea (also called Wallisian or East Uvean, on Uvea or Wallis island, Wallis and Futuna)
Pukapukan (Pukapuka in the Cook Islands)
Samoan (Samoa and American Samoa)
Tokelauan (Tokelau)
Niuatoputapu (on Niuatoputapu in Tonga, extinct)
Ellicean
Tuvaluan (Tuvalu)
Kapingamarangi (Kapingamarangi in the Federated States of Micronesia)
Nukuoro (Nukuoro in the Federated States of Micronesia)
Ontong Java (Ontong Java in the Solomon Islands)
Sikaiana (Sikaiana in the Solomon Islands)
Takuu language (Takuu in the eastern islands of Papua New Guinea)
Nukumanu (Nukumanu in the eastern islands of Papua New Guinea)
Nuguria (Nuguria in the eastern islands of Papua New Guinea)
Futunic
Anuta (Anuta in the Solomon Islands)
Futuna (or East Futunan, on Futuna in Wallis and Futuna)
Futuna-Aniwa (or West Futunan, on Futuna and Aniwa in Vanuatu)
Emae (Emae in Vanuatu)
Rennellese (Rennell in the Solomon Islands)
Mele-Fila (Mele in Vanuatu)
Pileni (Pileni in the Solomon Islands)
Tikopia (Tikopia in the Solomon Islands)
Uvean (or West Uvean, on Ouvéa, New Caledonia)

See also

 
Languages of Papua New Guinea
Languages of the Solomon Islands